The Sauber C3 was the third sports prototype racing car that Swiss Peter Sauber designed and developed. It was built in 1973. It scored one race win, seven podium finishes, clinched one pole position, and achieved three additional wins in its class. It was powered by a naturally aspirated  Ford-Cosworth BDG four-cylinder engine, developing .

References

Rear-wheel-drive vehicles
Mid-engined cars
Sports prototypes
Cars introduced in 1973
Cars of Switzerland
Sauber Motorsport